Damien Fleury (born 1 February 1986) is a French professional ice hockey forward who currently plays for Brûleurs de Loups in the Ligue Magnus as well as the French national team.

Playing career 
Fleury began his professional career in his native Ligue Magnus with his hometown team Drakkars de Caen. After tenures with Ours de Villard-de-Lans and Brûleurs de Loups of Grenoble, Fleury moved to Sweden in 2010 with VIK Västerås HK of the HockeyAllsvenskan. A year later, he moved to the top-tier Elitserien with spells at Luleå HF and Timrå IK before moving back down to HockeyAllsvenskan with Södertälje SK. He also had a brief spell in Switzerland's National League A with Lausanne HC.

In 2014, Fleury returned to Sweden's top-tier league, now called the Swedish Hockey League, with Djurgårgens IF after a mid-season transfer from Finnish Liiga club, Sport. On 16 April 2015, Fleury signed a one-year contract to join German club, Schwenninger Wild Wings of the DEL for the 2015–16 season. He left the Wild Wings upon the conclusion of the 2015-16 season and was one of the first players to join the newest member of the Kontinental Hockey League, the Chinese team Kunlun Red Star.

Fleury participated at the 2013 and 2011 IIHF World Championship as a member of the France men's national ice hockey team.

References

External links
 

1986 births
Living people
French ice hockey forwards
Sportspeople from Caen
Brûleurs de Loups players
Djurgårdens IF Hockey players
Drakkars de Caen players
HC Kunlun Red Star players
Lausanne HC players
Lukko players
Luleå HF players
Ours de Villard-de-Lans players
Schwenninger Wild Wings players
Södertälje SK players
Timrå IK players
Vaasan Sport players
VIK Västerås HK players